Mykola Antonovich Shvets ( born September 6, 1955, Piatykhatky) is a Ukrainian politician.

From 1999 to August 2003 he was the head of the Dnipropetrovsk Regional State Administration, appointed by decree of the President of Ukraine dated April 27, 1999.

References

External links
 Dovidka.com.ua - Mykola Shvets

1955 births
Living people
Governors of Dnipropetrovsk Oblast
People from Dnipropetrovsk Oblast
Recipients of the Order of Merit (Ukraine), 2nd class
Recipients of the Order of Merit (Ukraine), 3rd class